Bouficha (بوفيشة) or Bou Ficha is a Tunisian town situated about sixty kilometers south of Tunis, between Enfidha and Hammamet and close to the Gulf of Hammamet.

Administratively attached to the Sousse Governorate, it has a population of 9,931.

It is an important industrial center particularly in the textile sector. Near the town is the archaeological site of Pheradi Majus and a zoo, Friguia Park, on thirty hectares.

In July, a festival is held in polycultural Bouficha.

See also
List of cities in Tunisia

References

Populated places in Tunisia
Communes of Tunisia